The 1999 Alfred Dunhill Cup was the 15th Alfred Dunhill Cup. It was a team tournament featuring 16 countries, each represented by three players. The Cup was played 7–10 October at the Old Course at St Andrews in Scotland. The sponsor was the Alfred Dunhill company. The Spanish team of Sergio García, Miguel Ángel Jiménez, and José María Olazábal beat the Australian team of Stephen Leaney, Peter O'Malley, and Craig Parry in the final.

Format
The Cup was a match play event played over four days. The teams were divided into four four-team groups. The top eight teams were seeded with the remaining teams randomly placed in the bracket. After three rounds of round-robin play, the top team in each group advanced to a single elimination playoff.

In each team match, the three players were paired with their opponents and played 18 holes at medal match play. Matches tied at the end of 18 holes were extended to a sudden-death playoff, unless they could not affect the outcome of the tournament (third round). The tie-breaker for ties within a group was based on match record, then head-to-head.

Group play

Round one
Source:

Group 1

Group 2

Group 3

Group 4

Olazábal won on the first playoff hole.

Round two
Source:

Group 1

Group 2

Franco won on the second playoff hole.

Tomori won on the first playoff hole.

Group 3

Group 4

Round three
Source:

Group 1

Group 2

Group 3

Group 4

Price won on the third playoff hole.

Jiménez won on the first playoff hole.

Standings

Playoffs
Source:

Bracket

Semi-finals

Parry won on the first playoff hole.
Leaney won on the first playoff hole.

Final

Parry won on the first playoff hole.

Team results

Player results

References

External links
Coverage on the European Tour's official site

Alfred Dunhill Cup
Alfred Dunhill Cup
Alfred Dunhill Cup
Alfred Dunhill Cup